The 2005 NCAA Division II football season, part of college football in the United States organized by the National Collegiate Athletic Association at the Division II level, began on August 27, 2005, and concluded with the NCAA Division II Football Championship on December 10, 2005 at Braly Municipal Stadium in Florence, Alabama, hosted by the University of North Alabama. The Grand Valley State Lakers defeated the Northwest Missouri State Bearcats, 21–17, to win their third Division II national title.

The Harlon Hill Trophy was awarded to Jimmy Terwilliger, quarterback from East Stroudsburg.

Conference changes and new programs

Stillman completed their transition to Division II and became eligible for the postseason.

Conference standings

Northeast Region

Southeast Region

Northwest Region

Southwest Region

Conference summaries

Postseason

The 2005 NCAA Division II Football Championship playoffs were the 32nd single-elimination tournament to determine the national champion of men's NCAA Division II college football. The championship game was held at Braly Municipal Stadium in Florence, Alabama for the 18th time.

Seeded teams
Bloomsburg 
Grand Valley State
Nebraska–Omaha
North Carolina Central
Presbyterian
Shepherd
Washburn
West Texas A&M

Playoff bracket

* Home team    † Overtime

See also
 2005 NCAA Division I-A football season
 2005 NCAA Division I-AA football season
 2005 NCAA Division III football season
 2005 NAIA football season

References